The 19th Youth in Film Awards ceremony (now known as the Young Artist Awards), presented by the Youth in Film Association, honored outstanding youth performers under the age of 21 in the fields of film, television and theatre for the 1996-1997 season, and took place on March 14, 1998, in Hollywood, California.

Established in 1978 by long-standing Hollywood Foreign Press Association member, Maureen Dragone, the Youth in Film Association was the first organization to establish an awards ceremony specifically set to recognize and award the contributions of performers under the age of 21 in the fields of film, television, theatre and music.

Categories
★ Bold indicates the winner in each category.

Best Young Performer in a Feature Film

Best Performance in a Feature Film: Leading Young Actor
★  (tie) Blake Heron - Shiloh
★  (tie) Kevin Zegers - Air Bud
Mario Yedidia - Warriors of Virtue
Blake Foster - Turbo: A Power Rangers Movie
Brandon Hammond - Soul Food

Best Performance in a Feature Film: Leading Young Actress
★ Mara Wilson - A Simple Wish
Florence Hoath - FairyTale: A True Story
Christina Ricci - That Darn Cat
Jurnee Smollett - Eve's Bayou
Jennifer Love Hewitt - I Know What You Did Last Summer

Best Performance in a Feature Film: Supporting Young Actor
★ Jeremy Foley - Dante's Peak
Erik Von Detten - Leave It to Beaver
Adam Zolotin - Leave It to Beaver
Elijah Wood - The Ice Storm
Brendan Fletcher - Air Bud

Best Performance in a Feature Film: Supporting Young Actress
★ Jessica Biel - Ulee's Gold
Vanessa Zima - Ulee's Gold
Christina Ricci - The Ice Storm
Rebecca Lee Meza - Selena

Best Performance in a Feature Film: Young Actor Age Ten or Under
★ Joseph Ashton - The Education of Little Tree
Justin Cooper - Liar Liar
Cameron Finley - Leave It to Beaver
Alex D. Linz - Home Alone 3
Vincent Berry - Free Willy 3: The Rescue

Best Performance in a Feature Film: Young Actress Age Ten or Under
★ Jamie Renée Smith - Dante's Peak
Mika Boorem - The Education of Little Tree
Danielle Wiener - Traveller
Elizabeth Earl - FairyTale: A True Story

Best Young Performer in a TV Movie, Pilot or Mini-Series

Best Performance in a TV Movie / Pilot / Mini-Series: Leading Young Actor
★ Gregory Smith - Shadow Zone: My Teacher Ate My Homework
Robert Ri'chard - In His Father's Shoes
Bradley Pierce - Doom Runners
Lucas Black - Flash
Joseph Cross - Northern Lights

Best Performance in a TV Movie / Pilot / Mini-Series: Leading Young Actress
★ Jena Malone - Ellen Foster
Anna Chlumsky - A Child's Wish
Anna Paquin - The Member of the Wedding
Kirsten Dunst - Tower of Terror
Ashley Peldon - The Westing Game (aka: Get a Clue)

Best Performance in a TV Movie / Pilot / Mini-Series: Supporting Young Actor
★ Edwin Hodge - Shadow Zone: My Teacher Ate My Homework
Phillip Van Dyke - The Ticket
Kevin Zegers - A Call To Remember
Tim Redwine - The Last Don
Shawn Toovey - Flash
Bill Switzer - The Christmas List

Best Performance in a TV Movie / Pilot / Mini-Series: Supporting Young Actress
★ Shadia Simmons - In His Father's Shoes
Tina Majorino - Before Women Had Wings
Kimberly J. Brown - Ellen Foster
Allison Jones - Ellen Foster
Mairon Bennett - Flood A River's Rampage
Courtney Peldon - Little Girls in Pretty Boxes

Best Performance in a TV Movie / Pilot / Mini-Series: Young Actor Age 10 or Under
★ Seth Adkins - First Do No Harm
Courtland Mead - The Shining
Frankie Muniz -What the Deaf Man Heard
Alex Trench - Oliver Twist
Eric Lloyd - A Christmas Memory

Best Performance in a TV Movie / Pilot / Mini-Series: Young Actress Age 10 or Under
★ Kristen Bone - Flood: A River's Rampage
Courtney Chase - Rose Hill
Alexandra Purvis - Ronnie & Julie
Dara Perlmutter - Shadow Zone: My Teacher Ate My Homework

Best Young Performer in a TV Drama Series

Best Performance in a TV Drama Series: Leading Young Actor
★  (tie) Austin O'Brien - Promised Land
★  (tie) Michael Yarmush - My Life as a Dog
David Gallagher - 7th Heaven
Shawn Toovey - Dr. Quinn, Medicine Woman
Eddie Karr - Promised Land

Best Performance in a TV Drama Series: Leading Young Actress
★  (tie) Beverley Mitchell - 7th Heaven
★  (tie) Sarah Schaub - Promised Land
Jessica Bowman - Dr. Quinn, Medicine Woman
Jessica Biel - 7th Heaven
Larisa Oleynik - The Secret World of Alex Mack

Best Performance in a TV Drama Series: Supporting Young Actor
★ Ryan Merriman - The Pretender
Shane Sweet - The Journey of Allen Strange
Jimmy Galeota - Michael Hayes

Best Performance in a TV Drama Series: Supporting Young Actress
★ Brittany Tiplady - Millennium
Caitlin Wachs - Profiler
Mackenzie Rosman - 7th Heaven

Best Performance in a TV Drama Series: Guest Starring Young Actor
★ Trevor O'Brien - Promised Land
Bradley Pierce - Touched by an Angel
Jeremy Foley - Buffy the Vampire Slayer
Zackery McLemore - Gun
Zachary Browne - The Pretender
Haley Joel Osment - Walker, Texas Ranger
Bobby Brewer - 7th Heaven

Best Performance in a TV Drama Series: Guest Starring Young Actress
★ Cara Rose - Touched by an Angel
Allison Bertolino - Party of Five
Molly Orr - 7th Heaven
Courtney Jacquin - EZ Streets
Danielle Wiener - 7th Heaven
Lauren Diewold - Millennium
Aria Noelle Curzon - The Adventures of A.R.K.

Best Young Performer in a TV Comedy Series

Best Performance in a TV Comedy Series: Leading Young Performer
★ Melissa Joan Hart - Sabrina the Teenage Witch
Ben Savage - Boy Meets World
Mike Damus - Teen Angel
Corbin Allred - Teen Angel
Tahj Mowry - Smart Guy
Jordan Wall - Wishbone
Brandy Norwood - Moesha

Best Performance in a TV Comedy Series: Supporting Young Actor
★ Kyle Sabihy - Hiller and Diller
Brandon Hammond - The Gregory Hines Show
Benjamin Salisbury - The Nanny
Justin Berfield - Unhappily Ever After
Rahi Azizi - Space Cases

Best Performance in a TV Comedy Series: Supporting Young Actress
★ Michelle Trachtenberg - Meego
Kaitlin Cullum - Grace Under Fire
Faryn Einhom - Hiller and Diller
Madeline Zima - The Nanny
Alex McKenna - You Wish

Best Performance in a TV Comedy Series: Guest Starring Young Actor
★ Kyle Gibson - Jenny
Billee Thomas - The Parent 'Hood
Miles Marsico - Johnnytime
Cody McMains - The Parent 'Hood

Best Performance in a TV Comedy Series: Guest Starring Young Actress
★ Sydney Berry - 3rd Rock from the Sun
Emily Hart - Sabrina, the Teenage Witch
Mika Boorem - The Drew Carey Show
Cara Rose - Ellen

Best Performance in a TV Comedy Series: Young Actor Age Ten or Under
★ Jonathan Osser - Hiller and Diller
Michael Finiguerra - Soul Man
Angelo Massagli - Cosby
Haley Joel Osment - Murphy Brown
Curtis Williams - The Parent 'Hood

Best Performance in a TV Comedy Series: Young Actress Age Ten or Under
★ Madylin Sweeten - Everybody Loves Raymond
Jillian Berard - Hiller and Diller
Courtney Chase - Soul Man
Ashli Amari Adams - The Parent 'Hood

Best Young Performer in a TV Daytime Drama

Best Performance in a Daytime Drama: Young Performers (Male & Female)
★ Lamont Bentley (Male) - Moesha
★ Brandy (Female) - Moesha
Bryant Jones - The Young and the Restless
Christian Siefert - As the World Turns
Camryn Grimes - The Young and the Restless

Best Young Performer in a Voice-Over

Best Performance in a Voice-Over - TV or Film: Young Actor
★ Mathew Valencia - The New Batman Adventures
Ryan O'Donohue - Recess
Sam Gifaldi - Hey Arnold!
Phillip Van Dyke - Hey Arnold!
Josh Keaton - Hercules

Best Performance in a Voice-Over - TV or Film: Young Actress
★ Francesca Smith - Hey Arnold!
Anndi McAfee - Recess
Aria Noelle Curzon - Annabelle's Wish
Ashley Peldon - Cats Don't Dance
Lindsay Louie - Sing Me A Song

Best Young Ensemble Performance

Best Performance in a TV Movie or Feature Film: Young Ensemble
★ The Right Connections
Elizabeth Hart, Emily Hart, Alexandra Hart-Gilliams, Brian Hart, Melissa Joan Hart
Ditchdigger's Daughter
Adrienne Monique Coleman, Jameelah Nuriddin, Kiara Tucker, Rae'Ven Kelly, Malaika Jabali, Niaja Cotton
Rose Hill
Kevin Zegers, David Klein, Blair Slater, Michael Alexander Jackson
Under Wraps
Mario Yedidia, Adam Wylie, Clara Bryant

Best Family Entertainment

Best Family TV Movie / Pilot / Mini-Series (Network)
★ First Do No Harm - ABC
Ellen Foster - CBS
Miracle in the Woods - CBS
What the Deaf Man Heard - CBS
Oliver Twist - ABC
Flash - ABC

Best Family TV Movie / Pilot / Mini-Series (Cable)
★ ''The Right Connections - ShowtimeUnder Wraps - Disney
Whiskers - Showtime
Ditchdigger's Daughters - Family Channel
The Christmas List - Family Channel
Little Girls in Pretty Boxes - Lifetime Channel

Best Educational TV Show
★ Bear in the Big Blue House - Disney ChannelBill Nye the Science Guy - PBS
Wishbone - PBS
Skinnamarink TV - The Learning Channel
Wild About Animals - ABC

Best Family TV Comedy Series
★ Sabrina the Teenage Witch - ABCSoul Man - ABC
The Gregory Hines Show - CBS
Everybody Loves Raymond - CBS
The Parent 'Hood - WB
Teen Angel - ABC

Best Family TV Drama Series
★  (tie) Promised Land - CBS★  (tie) 7th Heaven - WBTouched by an Angel - CBS
The Secret World of Alex Mack - Nickelodeon
The Journey of Allen Strange - Nickelodeon

Youth In Film's Special Awards

The Jackie Coogan Award

Outstanding Contribution to Youth Through Motion Pictures
★ The Education of Little Tree - ParamountThe Michael Landon Award

Outstanding Contribution to Youth Through Television
★ Bryton McClureOutstanding Young Performer in a Television Commercial
★ Alan James Morgan - Target CorporationOutstanding Young Performers Live Theatre
★ Blake McIver Ewing★ Danielle WienerScholarship Recipients
★ Michael Seale, Jr.★ Josh EvansBest Family Feature Films
★ Animation: Anastasia - 20th Century Fox★ Comedy: Air Bud - DisneyBest Family Foreign Film
★ Ponette (France) - Arrow ReleasingBest Young Performers in a Foreign Film
★ Victoire Thivisol - Ponette (France)★ Misha Philipchuk - The Thief'' (Russia)

Former Child Star Lifetime Achievement Award
★ Gigi Perreau

References

External links
Official site

Young Artist Awards ceremonies
1997 film awards
1997 television awards
1998 in American cinema
1998 in American television
1998 in California